Joel McCoy Ingram (August 21, 1931 – June 8, 1998) was an American professional basketball power forward who played one season in the National Basketball Association (NBA) as a member of the Minneapolis Lakers during the 1957–58 season. He was also a one-time member of the Harlem Globetrotters. He attended Jackson State University.

Ingram died on June 8, 1998, in Gulfport, Mississippi, at age 67.

References

External links

1931 births
1998 deaths
American men's basketball players
Basketball players from Mississippi
Harlem Globetrotters players
Jackson State Tigers basketball players
Minneapolis Lakers players
Power forwards (basketball)